Parksepa is a small borough in Võru Parish, Võru County in southeastern Estonia.

References

Boroughs and small boroughs in Estonia